L. Jaya Sudha, also known as L. Jayasudha and L. Jayasudha Lakshmikanthan,  (born 19 June 1975) is an Indian politician and was a member of the 14th Tamil Nadu Legislative Assembly from the Polur constituency. She represented the All India Anna Dravida Munnetra Kazhagam party. The party allocated her seat to C. M. Murugan to contest in the 2016 elections.

Sudha was born on 19 June 1975 in Polur. She has a BA degree and is married with three children.

References 

1975 births
Tamil Nadu MLAs 2011–2016
All India Anna Dravida Munnetra Kazhagam politicians
Living people
21st-century Indian women politicians
21st-century Indian politicians
Women members of the Tamil Nadu Legislative Assembly